Caloia is an Italian surname. Notable people with the surname include:

 Angelo Caloia (born 1939), Italian economist and banker
 Neal Caloia (born 1970), American sports shooter

Italian-language surnames